Sânmihaiu Almaşului is a commune in Sălaj County, Transylvania, Romania. It is composed of three villages: Bercea (Bercse), Sânmihaiu Almașului, and Sântă Măria (Almásszentmária).

Sights 
 Wooden Church in Sânmihaiu Almașului (built in the 18th century), historic monument
 Wooden Church in Bercea (built in the 19th century)
 Wooden Church in Sântă Măria (c.1857)

References

Communes in Sălaj County
Localities in Transylvania